Statistics of National Association Football League in season 1919–20.

League standings
                                    GP   W   L   T  GF  GA Pts
 Bethlehem Steel           15  12   1   2  34   9  25
 Erie A.A.                      16  11   2   3  37  21  24
 Brooklyn Robins Dry Dock       14  1O   2   2  33  22  22
 Paterson F.C.                  15   7   1   7  23  29  15
 New York F.C.                  14   4   4   6  17  24  12
 Brooklyn Morse Dry Dock        14   4   3   7  22  2O  11
 Philadelphia Disston           12   2   2   8  16  19   6
 Kearny Federal Ship            11   2   2   7  19  28   6
 Philadelphia Merchant Ship     13   O   3  1O   7  36   3
 New York IRT                    5   0   0   5           0

References
NATIONAL ASSOCIATION FOOT BALL LEAGUE (RSSSF)

1919-20
1919–20 domestic association football leagues
1919–20 in American soccer